The 2000–01 ARY Gold Cup was a triangular ODI cricket competition held in Sharjah, United Arab Emirates from 8 to 20 April 2001. It featured the national cricket teams of New Zealand, Pakistan and Sri Lanka. The tournament was won by Sri Lanka, who defeated Pakistan in the final.

Points table

1st ODI

2nd ODI

3rd ODI

4th ODI

5th ODI

6th ODI

Final

References

2001 in Pakistani cricket
Cricket in the United Arab Emirates
2001 in Sri Lankan cricket
2001 in New Zealand cricket
One Day International cricket competitions
International cricket competitions from 1997–98 to 2000
2001 in Emirati cricket